Ochrus trifasciatus is a species of beetle in the family Cerambycidae. It was described by Dalens and Touroult in 2011.

References

Hesperophanini
Beetles described in 2011